Giuliano da Empoli (born 1973) is an Italian and Swiss political essayist, journalist and novelist. He is the founding chairman of Volta, a think tank based in Milan. In 2022, he published his debut novel , for which he received the Grand Prix du roman de l'Académie française.

Life and career 
Born in Neuilly-sur-Seine in 1973, Giuliano da Empoli grew up in several European countries, graduated in law at Sapienza University of Rome and obtained a master's degree in political science at the Institut d'études politiques de Paris (Sciences Po).

He has been Deputy Mayor for culture in Florence and a senior advisor to Italian Prime Minister Matteo Renzi.

He has also been an executive board member at the Venice Biennale and the chairman of the Gabinetto Vieusseux in Florence.

From 2006 to 2008, he served as Senior Advisor to Italy's Vice-Prime Minister and Minister of Culture, Francesco Rutelli, establishing the first Italian Design Council in Milan.

From 2014, he is member of the Italy-USA Foundation.

In 2016, he founded the think tank Volta, a member of the Global Progress network.

He has been a guest speaker at numerous conferences around the world (including São Paulo's ESPM, Geneva's Finance Foundation, Paris' Foundation Ricard and Zürich's Club Baur au Lac) and is a member of The Travellers Club in Paris.

Writer and journalist 
Since 1996, he has been a regular contributor and columnist for the country's leading printed media, including Il Corriere della Sera, La Repubblica, Il Sole 24 Ore and Il Riformista.

He also hosted a weekly talk radio show on Italy's main financial news radio, Radio 24. As an author and social commentator, he has been regularly appearing on all of the main Italian TV channels.

At the age of twenty-two he published his first book "Un grande futuro dietro di noi" about the problems faced by the Italian youth, which sprung a national debate and led the newspaper La Stampa to designate him "Man of the year".

In 2022, he published his debut novel Le mage du Kremlin (The Wizard of the Kremlin), whose main character is modelled on Vladimir Putin's advisor Vladislav Surkov. The novel was awarded the 2022 Grand Prix du roman de l'Académie française. The novel was a finalist for the 2022 Prix Goncourt. The novel lost to Brigitte Giraud's Vivre vite after fourteen rounds of voting ended in a stalemate, leading the president of the Goncourt Academy to cast the deciding vote, choosing Giraud over Giuliano da Empoli.

Books 
Un grande futuro dietro di noi (Marsilio, 1996) 
La Guerra del talento (2000) about meritocracy and mobility in the digital economy 
Overdose (2002) about information overload 
Fuori controllo (2004) about the "brazilification" of contemporary society (translated into French by Grasset and Brazilian Portuguese by Sulina) 
La sindrome di Meucci (2005) about Italy's creative industries 
Canton Express (2008), a historical travelogue (translated into Portuguese by Livraria Bertrand) 
Obama, La politica nell'era di Facebook (2008) about Barack Obama's election as an example of auto-biographical politics  
Contro gli specialisti (Marsilio, 2013) 
La prova del potere (Mondadori, 2015) 
Le Florentin (Grasset, 2016) 
La rabbia e l'algoritmo (Marsilio, 2017) 
Les ingénieurs du chaos (Lattès, 2019) 
Le mage du Kremlin (Gallimard, 2022)

References

External links 
 Florence municipality website
Venice Biennale website
 Radio France Interview (in French)
Epoca, leading brazilian magazine interview (in Portuguese)
Venice Sessions talks (in Italian)

1973 births
Living people
Italian male writers
Swiss male writers
Italian columnists
Swiss columnists
Italian journalists
Swiss journalists
Italian political writers
Grand Prix du roman de l'Académie française winners
People from Neuilly-sur-Seine
Sapienza University of Rome
Sciences Po alumni